Lophopappus is a genus of South American flowering plants in the family Asteraceae.

 Species
 Lophopappus blakei Cabrera - Peru
 Lophopappus cuneatus R.E.Fr. - Bolivia, Jujuy Province in Argentina
 Lophopappus foliosus Rusby - Bolivia, Peru, Jujuy Province in Argentina, Tarapacá Region in Chile
 Lophopappus tarapacanus (Phil.) Cabrera - Tarapacá Region in Chile

References

External links
 Tree of Life Web Project. 2009. Lophopappus. Version 11 January 2009 (temporary). http://tolweb.org/Lophopappus/120134/2009.01.11 in The Tree of Life Web Project, http://tolweb.org/

Nassauvieae
Asteraceae genera
Flora of South America